The 1952 Army Cadets football team represented the United States Military Academy during the 1952 college football season.

Schedule

Personnel

References

Army
Army Black Knights football seasons
Army Cadets football